Vince Williams may refer to:
Vince Williams (actor) (1957–1997), American actor
Vince Williams (American football) (born 1989), American football linebacker
Vince Williams (ice hockey) (born 1975), Canadian ice hockey defenseman
Vince Williams Jr. (born 2000), American basketball player